Bloxwich United A.F.C. was a football club based in Bloxwich, England. Prior to 2008 the club was called Birchills United. In the 2007–08 season, they were champions of the West Midlands (Regional) League Division One. The club resigned midway through the 2012–13 season and folded.

History
The club was formed by Michael Moseley, Steve Hinks, Jason Moseley and Ian Mason in 2006.  Starting life as members of the Wolverhampton Combination, they won all 20 league games as well as the Baker Cup and Oakley Cup.  Agreeing a deal to play at the Old Red Lion Ground in Bloxwich in the summer of 2007, they were accepted into the West Midlands (Regional) League.

Getting a place in the First Division because of their facilities, the club spent the majority of the 2007–08 campaign at the top of the table and won the championship of the division.  For the start of the 2008–09 season the club changed its name to Bloxwich United.

In 2009, former Aston Villa midfielder Stephen Cooke signed for the club.

Honours
West Midlands (Regional) League Premier Division
Runners-up 2008–09, 2009–10
West Midlands (Regional) League Division One
Champions 2007–08

Records
FA Cup
Extra Preliminary Round 2011–12
FA Vase
Fourth Round 2010–11

References

Defunct football clubs in England
Sport in Wolverhampton
Midland Football Combination
Sport in Walsall
2006 establishments in England
Association football clubs established in 2006
Association football clubs disestablished in 2012
Defunct football clubs in the West Midlands (county)